Al-Murtaḍá al-Husaynī al-Zabīdī, or Muḥammad ibn Muḥammad Murtaḍá al-Zabīdī (1732-1790), (1145-1205AH) was an Islamic scholar. He is also the author of the renowned dictionary Tāj al-ʻĀrūs min Jawāhir al-Qāmūs (The Chaplet of the Bride out of the Gems of al-Qāmūs). He wrote commentary on the famous book of Ghazzali on the revival of religious disciplines. 

Murtaḍá' was born in 1732 (1145AH) in Bilgram, Hardoi, Uttar Pradesh, India. His family originated from Wasit in Iraq, from where his parents had emigrated to the Hadramawt region in the east of Yemenwhere the Husaynī tribe is situated.  Murtaḍá earned his nisba 'al-Zabīdī' from Zabīd in the south western coastal plains of Yemen, which was a centre of academic learning where he had spent time studying. He died in Egypt during a  plague in 1790 (1205AH).

Works
Taj al-Arus min Jawahir al-Qamus 'The Bride's Crown from the Pearls of the Qamus (Dictionary)'; an expansion of Fairuzabadi's Al-Qamoos, the most frequently cited dictionary of Classical Arabic after Lisān al-ʿArab by Ibn Manẓūr.

Itḥāf al-sadāh al-muttaqīn bi sharḥ iḥyāʾ ʿulūm al-dīn: A commentary on al-Ghazali's monumental Ihya' Ulum al-Din.
Al-Rauḍ al-ǧalī fī ansāb Āl Bā ʻAlawī (Damascus, Dār Kinān li-ṭ-Ṭibāʻa wa an-Našr wa-t-Tauzī, 2010)

Al-Ūqyānūs al-basīṭ fī tarjamat al-Qāmūs al-muḥīṭ; (al-Qāhirah, Maṭbaʻat Būlāq, 1834)

References

External links
A short biography and list of works: Imam Sayyid Murtada al-Zabidi
The entire work of Taj al-Arus in pdf format: تاج العروس - الزبيدي

Hanafis
Maturidis
Mujaddid
Arab lexicographers
Sunni Sufis
Indian Sufis
Iraqi Sufis
Naqshbandi order
Yemeni Sufis
Yemeni writers
1732 births
1790 deaths
18th-century lexicographers
18th-century philologists